Lord George Seymour-Conway (21 July 1763 – 10 March 1848), known as Lord George Seymour, was a British politician.

A member of the Seymour family headed by the Duke of Somerset, Seymour was the seventh son and youngest child of Francis Seymour-Conway, 1st Marquess of Hertford, and Lady Isabella, daughter of Charles FitzRoy, 2nd Duke of Grafton. He was the brother of Francis Ingram-Seymour-Conway, 2nd Marquess of Hertford, Lord Henry Seymour, Lord Robert Seymour, Lord Hugh Seymour and Lord William Seymour.

He was returned to the Parliament of Great Britain as one of two representatives for Orford in 1784, a seat he held until 1790. He later represented Totnes between 1796 and 1801.

Seymour married Isabella, daughter of Reverend the Honourable George Hamilton, in 1795. Their son Sir George Hamilton Seymour was a diplomat. Seymour died on 10 March 1848, aged 84, and is buried in St. Andrew's Church, Waterloo Street Hove in Sussex

References

1763 births
1848 deaths
British MPs 1784–1790
British MPs 1796–1800
George
Members of the Parliament of Great Britain for Totnes
Members of the Parliament of the United Kingdom for English constituencies
UK MPs 1801–1802
Younger sons of marquesses
Onslow family